Jackson Quiñónez Vernaza (born 12 June 1980 in Esmeraldas, Ecuador) is a Spanish hurdler of Afro-Ecuadorian descent. He represented his birth country Ecuador until October 2005.

Career
He won the bronze medal in 60 metres hurdles for his new country at the 2007 European Indoor Championships. For Ecuador he competed at the World Championships in 2003 and 2005 as well as the 2004 Olympic Games without reaching the final round.

His personal best time is 13.34 seconds, achieved in July 2006 in Zaragoza. This is the current Spanish record. He still holds the Ecuadorian records in 110 metres hurdles with 13.44 seconds, and in the indoor high jump with 2.10 metres.

Competition record

References

External links
 XL Jackson Quiñónez
 

1980 births
Living people
Sportspeople from Esmeraldas, Ecuador
Spanish male hurdlers
Ecuadorian male hurdlers
Ecuadorian male high jumpers
Olympic athletes of Ecuador
Athletes (track and field) at the 2004 Summer Olympics
Olympic athletes of Spain
Athletes (track and field) at the 2008 Summer Olympics
Athletes (track and field) at the 2012 Summer Olympics
Pan American Games competitors for Ecuador
Athletes (track and field) at the 1999 Pan American Games
Athletes (track and field) at the 2003 Pan American Games
World Athletics Championships athletes for Ecuador
World Athletics Championships athletes for Spain
Ecuadorian emigrants to Spain
Mediterranean Games gold medalists for Spain
Athletes (track and field) at the 2009 Mediterranean Games
South American Games gold medalists for Ecuador
South American Games silver medalists for Ecuador
South American Games medalists in athletics
Mediterranean Games medalists in athletics
Competitors at the 1998 South American Games